Asthenotricha deficiens is a moth in the family Geometridae first described by Claude Herbulot in 1954. It is found on Madagascar.

References

Moths described in 1954
Asthenotricha
Moths of Madagascar
Moths of Africa